Mark W. Elliott is a scholar of religion who teaches at University of St Andrews.

Works

References

Living people
Academics of the University of St Andrews
Year of birth missing (living people)
21st-century Christian theologians